Affairs of a Model (Swedish: Det är min modell) is a 1946 Swedish comedy film directed by Gustaf Molander and starring Maj-Britt Nilsson, Alf Kjellin and Olof Winnerstrand. It was shot at the Råsunda Studios in Stockholm. The film's sets were designed by the art director Arne Åkermark.

Cast
 Maj-Britt Nilsson as 	Dora Svensson
 Alf Kjellin as Erik Lunde
 Olof Winnerstrand as 	Svante Piehl
 Stig Järrel as 	Consul-general Redel
 Oscar Winge as Filip Gregersson
 Marianne Löfgren as Vera Lund
 Anna-Lisa Baude as 	Svea Ohlsson
 Georg Funkquist as Allan Rune
 Wiktor Andersson as 	Johansson
 Margot Ryding as 	Countess Agatha von Sommerfeldt
 Olav Riégo as 	Bishop Ekkvist 
 Ernst Brunman as 	Håkansson, communist editor
 Sven Bergvall as 	Gen. Leijonflycht
 Artur Rolén as 	Master of ceremonies 
 Inga Gill as Waitress at Gyldene Tunnan

References

Bibliography 
 Qvist, Per Olov & von Bagh, Peter. Guide to the Cinema of Sweden and Finland. Greenwood Publishing Group, 2000.

External links 
 

1946 films
Swedish drama films
1946 drama films
1940s Swedish-language films
Films directed by Gustaf Molander
Swedish black-and-white films
1940s Swedish films